Sergey Pavlov (ukr.: Сергій Валерійович Павлов) (born 26 September 1987) is a Ukrainian chess player who holds the title of International Master (IM, 2008). Ukrainian Chess Championship winner in 2010.

Chess career
Two times Kyiv chess championship winner (2005, 2008). In 2008 he was awarded the FIDE International Master (IM) title. In 2009 in Kyiv Sergey Pavlov won Nabokov Chess Memorial. In 2010 in Alushta he won Ukrainian Chess Championship. In 2010 he won 2nd place in 17th Ukrainian Team Chess Championship with team "Rivne Forest Bisons". In 2013 he won 3rd place in 20th Ukrainian Team Chess Championship with team "Bratstvo Kyiv".
In August 2017 Sergey Pavlov won 2nd place in "RTU Open" "A" tournament.

References

External links

Sergey Pavlov chess games at 365Chess.com

1987 births
Ukrainian chess players
Chess International Masters
Living people